Johnson v. United States, 576 U.S. 591 (2015), was a United States Supreme Court case in which the Court ruled the Residual Clause of the Armed Career Criminal Act was unconstitutionally vague and in violation of due process.

Background

Armed Career Criminal Act
The Armed Career Criminal Act (ACCA) was a part of the Comprehensive Crime Control Act of 1984 that was enacted to impose tougher sentences in illegal firearms cases on defendants who have previously been convicted three or more times for "violent" felonies.  defined a "violent felony" as an act that threatens "use of physical force against the person of another," "is burglary, arson, or extortion," "involves use of explosives," or "otherwise involves conduct that presents a serious potential risk of physical injury to another." The last part of this definition became known as the "residual clause".

Case History
Samuel James Johnson was a lifelong criminal and active white supremacist who, starting in 2010, was monitored by the FBI due to his involvement in suspected terrorist groups. Over the years, he revealed to undercover agents his plans to carry out terrorist attacks, as well as his illegal supply of weapons. In 2012, he was indicted on multiple counts of being a felon in possession of firearms and ammunition. Johnson pleaded guilty to the weapons charges and was sentenced under the ACCA's residual clause to a statutory minimum of 15 years for having three prior "violent felony" convictions, one of which was possession of a sawed-off shotgun.

Arguments

Johnson's lawyers argued that mere possession of a sawed-off shotgun does not qualify as a "violent felony" as described under the residual clause. In 2013, an appeal to the Eighth Circuit upheld the decision by the District Court to sentence Johnson to 15 years in accordance to the ACCA. The Supreme Court of the United States originally granted the case certiorari to decide if the state law banning possession of a sawed-off shot gun qualified as a "violent felony" under the residual clause. The case was initially argued on November 5, 2014, but the Court asked the parties to reconvene and directly address the question of whether or not the residual clause was unconstitutionally vague. The case was reargued on April 20, 2015.

Opinions

Majority
Justice Scalia wrote the opinion of the Court, which determined the residual clause to be in violation of the Fifth Amendment. Scalia described the statute as a "failed enterprise" that invited "arbitrary enforcement." He declared that individuals are unconstitutionally deprived of due process when they are convicted under "a criminal law so vague that it fails to give ordinary people fair notice of the conduct it punishes."

The Court had raised the specter of unconstitutional vagueness in two prior cases regarding the residual clause—James v. United States and Sykes v. United States—that "honed in on the imprecision of the phrase 'serious potential risk'". However, "neither opinion evaluated the uncertainty introduced by the need to evaluate the riskiness of an abstract ordinary case of a crime." 

Noting that "[d]ecisions under the residual clause have proved to be anything but evenhanded, predictable, or consistent", the Court decided that "[s]tanding by James and Sykes would undermine, rather than promote, the goals that stare decisis is meant to serve." The Court held that the residual clause was unconstitutionally vague, overruling the contrary holdings in James and Sykes.

Concurrences
Justices Kennedy and Thomas wrote separate opinions concurring in judgment, but disagreeing that the residual clause of ACCA is unconstitutionally vague.

Dissent
Justice Alito dissented, arguing that the court could and therefore should interpret the residual clause in a narrower way that meets constitutional standards. He also found the circumstances of Johnson's sawed-off shotgun conviction, it being in his possession during a drug deal in a public parking lot, could have met even a narrow interpretation of the clause.

See also
 List of United States Supreme Court cases, volume 576
 Armed Career Criminal Act
 Sessions v. Dimaya (2018) - constitutionality of similar clause in civil context (specifically, deportation), in which a plurality found straightforward application of Johnson to be dispositive
 Stokeling v. United States (2019) - touches on the same section of the Armed Career Criminal Act and references this decision often

Previous Supreme Court decisions about the "residual clause" of the Armed Career Criminal Act:
 James v. United States (2007) - overruled in part by Johnson
 Begay v. United States (2008)
 Chambers v. United States (2009)
 Sykes v. United States (2011) - overruled in part by Johnson

References

External links
 
 Johnson v. United States,  overview (SCOTUSblog)

United States Supreme Court cases
United States Supreme Court cases of the Roberts Court
2015 in United States case law
Armed Career Criminal Act case law